Hugo Miguel Pereira de Almeida (born 23 May 1984) is a Portuguese former professional footballer who played as a centre-forward, currently assistant manager of Iranian club Sepahan.

After failing to establish himself at Porto, being loaned several times during his contract, he made a name for himself in Germany with Werder Bremen where he remained for four seasons, reaching one UEFA Cup final and scoring 63 competitive goals. He also spent several years in Turkey with Beşiktaş, netting 47 times in 109 total games.

Almeida, whose international career with Portugal spanned over a decade, succeeded in becoming a regular after the departures of Pauleta in 2006 and Liédson in 2010. He represented the nation at two World Cups and as many European Championships, earning 57 caps and scoring 19 goals.

Club career

Portugal
Born in Figueira da Foz, Coimbra District, Almeida started playing football for hometown club Naval 1º de Maio, before being signed by Porto still as a junior. He made his Primeira Liga debut in a 2–0 home win over Benfica on 21 September 2003, playing three minutes. Unable to settle at first, however, he had loan spells with União de Leiria (with which he had already played in the previous season, also on loan) and Boavista.

Almeida returned to Porto for 2005–06, having a relatively important role in a side that was crowned national champions. During that campaign's UEFA Champions League he scored a spectacular goal from a 35-metre free kick against Inter Milan at the San Siro, albeit in a 2–1 loss.

Werder Bremen

Almeida served another loan stint in 2006–07, with a solid first year at the Bundesliga's Werder Bremen, where he rejoined former Porto teammate Diego. He totalled ten goals in 41 appearances (in all competitions), including one in a 2–1 home loss against Espanyol in the semi-finals of the UEFA Cup, his shot floating over the goalkeeper and into the net in an eventual 4–2 aggregate defeat; after seeing his chances at Porto definitely cut down with the arrival of strikers Edgar and Ernesto Farías in August 2007, he decided to accept Bremen's offer for a permanent switch, penning a four-year deal worth €4 million.

With the departure of Miroslav Klose, who signed for Bayern Munich, Almeida's chances of first-team action improved dramatically, and he started the 2007–08 season in scoring fashion, netting seven times in his first 12 league games, including two goals in a 4–1 victory over defending champions VfB Stuttgart. He would finish the season with 16 goals in all competitions – 11 in the league, as his club finished second behind Bayern – only surpassed in the team by Diego's 17.

In 2008–09, another solid season, Almeida scored nine goals in the league, adding four in just five matches for the eventual DFB-Pokal winners – his first Bremen honour. His cup tally included a hat-trick against amateurs Eintracht Nordhorn, in a 9–3 away rout. In the Champions League he netted two more, being named the "Fans' Player of the match" in the 2–2 draw away to Anorthosis Famagusta. As the team were "demoted" to the UEFA Cup, he contributed one goal in eight games as the team went all the way to the final but, after receiving a yellow card in the 3–2 defeat of Hamburger SV in the semi-finals (3–3 aggregate win), he missed the decisive match against Shakhtar Donetsk.

Alternating starts with appearances from the bench, Almeida once again scored in double digits in the 2009–10 campaign, netting seven goals in the domestic league for a total of 11, as Bremen finished third and qualified to the Champions League play-off round, with the player assisting Claudio Pizarro in the third goal of the clash against Sampdoria (3–1 home win in the first leg, eventual 3–2 aggregate win).

Almeida started 2010–11 netting six times in the first ten league games. On 28 November 2010 he took his total to nine, after scoring three in a home win against FC St. Pauli (3–0) – in the dying minutes of the fixture, he was sent off after elbowing an opponent.

Beşiktaş
 
On Christmas Eve 2010, after scoring 11 goals in 21 official games for Bremen during the season, Almeida joined Beşiktaş in the Süper Lig, having agreed to a three-and-a-half-year contract for €2 million. On 11 May 2011, he converted his penalty in the shootout as the Istanbul team won the Turkish Cup against İstanbul Başakşehir (4–3, 2–2 after extra time).

During his time in Istanbul, Almeida was part of a Portuguese contingent including manager Carlos Carvalhal and five teammates including fellow internationals Manuel Fernandes, Simão Sabrosa and Ricardo Quaresma.

Later years
On 7 October 2014, free agent Almeida signed for Serie A newcomers Cesena. However, he struggled at his new club, managing only seven starts and terminating his contract by mutual consent on 20 January 2015. A week later, he joined Russia's Kuban Krasnodar.

Almeida moved to Anzhi Makhachkala who had just returned to the Russian Premier League on 8 July 2015. After just six months, both parties parted ways by mutual consent.

On 16 January 2016, Almeida returned to Germany and signed for Hannover 96 until summer 2017, reuniting with former Werder Bremen boss Thomas Schaaf in the process. He scored in his first appearance seven days later, but in a 2–1 home loss against Darmstadt 98. In February, he received a retrospective three-match ban for an elbow on FC Augsburg's Dominik Kohr, as the season ended with relegation.

Almeida joined AEK Athens from the Super League Greece on 18 July 2016, on a two-year contract. He scored twice in the first 15 minutes of his debut, a 4–1 home win over Xanthi on 11 September.

On 26 April 2017, in the return leg of the semi-finals of the Greek Football Cup against Olympiacos, Almeida played as an emergency goalkeeper for the first time in his career, after Giannis Anestis was sent off in the closing minutes of the game. His team eventually advanced to the final on away goals, after a 2–2 aggregate draw.

Almeida's contract was terminated by mutual consent on 30 August 2017. The following day he signed a one-year deal with Hajduk Split from the Croatian First Football League, with the option for a further season.

Almeida returned to Portugal after an absence of 12 years in July 2018, at the age of 34. Citing family reasons, he agreed to a two-year contract at Académica de Coimbra. He made his LigaPro debut on 18 August, playing 36 minutes in a 1–0 home defeat against Paços de Ferreira and eventually acting as a goalkeeper after Peterson Peçanha was sent off.

On 6 February 2020, Almeida announced his retirement. He went instantly into coaching Académica's under-23 team.

International career

Almeida played at every level in international competitions, from the under-15 to the main Portugal national team. He made his full debut in a friendly against England on 18 February 2004, a 1–1 draw, and was also part of the squad that won the 2003 Toulon Tournament, also appearing at the 2004 and 2006 UEFA European Under-21 Championship finals.

Almeida was called for Portugal's final three UEFA Euro 2008 qualifiers, starting against Azerbaijan and scoring his first international goal. He also netted in the follow-up, a 1–0 win over Armenia, and these goals eventually proved vital as the nation clinched a tournament spot.

In Carlos Queiroz's second stint as national side coach, Almeida scored in a 4–0 victory in Malta on 6 September 2008, in the 2010 FIFA World Cup qualifying campaign. His importance diminished in late 2009, after the naturalisation of Sporting CP's Liédson.

Almeida was picked for the finals in South Africa. After the first match, a 0–0 against Ivory Coast, he replaced Liédson in the starting XI for the following match, with both players finding the net in the 7–0 rout of North Korea on 21 June 2010, in Cape Town.

Almeida was selected by new manager Paulo Bento for his Euro 2012 squad, initially as third choice after Hélder Postiga and Nélson Oliveira. After the former injured himself in the first half of the quarter-finals against Czech Republic, he replaced him, going on to start in the penalty shootout loss to Spain (0–0 after 120 minutes).

After being included in the list for the 2014 World Cup, Almeida started in the first group stage match against Germany, but was injured after just 28 minutes of play in an eventual 4–0 defeat. He went on to miss the second game against the United States with Postiga, who was also stretchered off after only 17 minutes, replacing him in the starting XI.

On 31 March 2015, Almeida captained Portugal for the first time in his final appearance, a 2–0 friendly loss to Cape Verde in Estoril.

Career statistics

Club

International

Scores and results list Portugal's goal tally first, score column indicates score after each Almeida goal.

Honours
Porto
Primeira Liga: 2003–04, 2005–06
Taça de Portugal: 2002–03, 2005–06
UEFA Champions League: 2003–04

Werder Bremen
DFB-Pokal: 2008–09
UEFA Cup runner-up: 2008–09

Beşiktaş
Turkish Cup: 2010–11

AEK Athens
Greek Football Cup runner-up: 2016–17

Individual
Turkish Cup top scorer: 2010–11

References

External links

1984 births
Living people
People from Figueira da Foz
Sportspeople from Coimbra District
Portuguese footballers
Association football forwards
Primeira Liga players
Liga Portugal 2 players
Segunda Divisão players
FC Porto B players
FC Porto players
U.D. Leiria players
Boavista F.C. players
Associação Académica de Coimbra – O.A.F. players
Bundesliga players
SV Werder Bremen players
Hannover 96 players
Süper Lig players
Beşiktaş J.K. footballers
Serie A players
A.C. Cesena players
Russian Premier League players
FC Kuban Krasnodar players
FC Anzhi Makhachkala players
Super League Greece players
AEK Athens F.C. players
Croatian Football League players
HNK Hajduk Split players
Portugal youth international footballers
Portugal under-21 international footballers
Portugal B international footballers
Portugal international footballers
UEFA Euro 2008 players
2010 FIFA World Cup players
UEFA Euro 2012 players
2014 FIFA World Cup players
Footballers at the 2004 Summer Olympics
Olympic footballers of Portugal
Portuguese expatriate footballers
Expatriate footballers in Germany
Expatriate footballers in Turkey
Expatriate footballers in Italy
Expatriate footballers in Russia
Expatriate footballers in Greece
Expatriate footballers in Croatia
Portuguese expatriate sportspeople in Germany
Portuguese expatriate sportspeople in Turkey
Portuguese expatriate sportspeople in Italy
Portuguese expatriate sportspeople in Russia
Portuguese expatriate sportspeople in Greece
Portuguese expatriate sportspeople in Croatia
Portuguese expatriate sportspeople in Iran
Outfield association footballers who played in goal